V Series is a television channel broadcasting TV series.

The channel launched on 16 February 2009 as TV1000 Drama. The same day, all TV1000 channels in the Nordic countries got new logos and graphics. Unlike the other TV1000 channels, which were broadcasting round-the-clock, TV1000 Drama would only broadcast between 6 p.m. and 6 a.m. It timeshared with Jetix and replaced the Travel Channel on Viasat's satellite platform. The channel was rebranded as Viasat Film Drama on 3 March 2012 and timeshifts with Disney Junior from 7pm to 6am. In 2015, the channel was rebranded as Viasat Series, the channel also replaced Viasat Crime.

Viasat Film Drama offers various genres of dramas, including costume dramas, life stories, crime and romance.

See also
V Film

References

Pan-Nordic television channels
Television stations in Denmark
Television channels in Sweden
Nordic Entertainment Group
Television channels and stations established in 2009